Kiitämä is a large lake in the Koutajoki (73) main catchment area. It is located in the region: Pohjois-Pohjanmaan maakunta. It belongs to the environmental responsibility area of the Pohjois-Pohjanmaan ELY Centre.

See also
List of lakes in Finland

References

Lakes of Kuusamo